Jeffrey Rosen (born February 13, 1965) is an American academic and commentator on legal affairs, who is widely published on legal issues and constitutional law. Since 2013, he has served as the president and CEO of the National Constitution Center, in Philadelphia.

Education
Rosen attended the Dalton School, a private college preparatory school on New York City's Upper East Side, and graduated in 1982 as valedictorian. He then studied English literature and government at Harvard University, graduating in 1986 with a Bachelor of Arts summa cum laude. He was subsequently a Marshall Scholar at Balliol College, Oxford in philosophy, politics, and economics, from which he received a second bachelor's degree in 1988. He then attended the Yale Law School, where he served as a senior editor of the Yale Law Journal and graduated with a Juris Doctor in 1991.

Career

After graduating from law school, Rosen served as law clerk to Chief Judge Abner Mikva of the United States Court of Appeals for the District of Columbia Circuit.

Rosen was the commentator on legal affairs for The New Republic from 1992 to 2014. He then joined The Atlantic, as a contributing editor. He was a staff writer at the New Yorker, and he is a frequent contributor to the New York Times Magazine.

Rosen is a professor of law at the Law School of George Washington University in Washington, D.C. He is a nonresident senior fellow at the Brookings Institution, where he speaks and writes about technology and the future of democracy. He often appears as a guest on National Public Radio.

Personal life
Rosen, the son of Estelle and Sidney Rosen, is married to Lauren Coyle Rosen, a cultural anthropologist, attorney, and assistant professor of anthropology at Princeton University. Previously, he was married to Christine Rosen (formerly Stolba), a historian. Rosen worked with Justice Elena Kagan for many years and is the brother-in-law of the former Acting Solicitor General of the United States Neal Katyal.

Journalism

Rosen has written frequently about the U.S. Supreme Court. He has interviewed Chief Justice John Roberts, Justice John Paul Stevens, Justice Stephen Breyer, Justice Elena Kagan, Justice Ruth Bader Ginsburg, Justice Neil Gorsuch and Justice Anthony Kennedy. Justice Ginsburg credited his early support for her Supreme Court candidacy as a factor in her nomination. "...she sent me a generous note, fanning my hopes of becoming a judicial Boswell. (You planted the idea, she wrote, I'll try hard to develop it.)" His essay about Sonia Sotomayor, then a potential Supreme Court nominee, provoked controversy for its use of anonymous sources, however, other media outlets, including the New York Times, had relied upon similar sources. In an opinion piece published after Kagan's nomination hearings and before the Senate's vote on her confirmation, Rosen encouraged Kagan to look to the late Justice Louis Brandeis as a model "to develop a positive vision of progressive jurisprudence in an age of economic crisis, financial power and technological change."

In 2006, the legal historian David Garrow called him "the nation's most widely read and influential legal commentator."

National Constitution Center
Congress chartered the Constitution Center "to disseminate information about the U.S. Constitution on a non-partisan basis." Rosen became president of the National Constitution Center in 2013. He has articulated the goal of creating an environment in which Americans with different political perspectives may convene on all media platforms for constitutional education and debate.

During Rosen's tenure, with a $5.5 million grant from the Templeton Foundation, the NCC formed the Coalition of Freedom Advisory Board, chaired by the heads of the conservative Federalist Society and liberal American Constitution Society, to oversee the creation of the "Interactive Constitution," which the College Board has made a centerpiece of the new AP history and government exams. The Interactive Constitution project commissions scholars to write about every clause of the Constitution, discussing areas of agreement and disagreement between left and right. It also allows users to explore the historic sources of the Bill of Rights and compare America's protected liberties to other constitutional systems throughout the world. The Interactive Constitution received nearly five million unique visitors in its first year online.

Rosen moderates the weekly podcast "We the People" for the National Constitution Center, convening liberal and conservative scholars to discuss timely constitutional issues as well as constitutional debates. In 2014, the Constitution Center opened the George H. W. Bush Bill of Rights gallery, displaying rare copies of the Constitution, the Declaration of Independence, and one of the twelve original copies of the Bill of Rights. In 2015, the Center opened a constitution drafting lab, supported by Google, that convenes constitution-drafters and students from around the world for constitution drafting exercises.

Selected works
 Conversations with RBG: Ruth Bader Ginsburg on Life, Love, Liberty, and Law, New York: Henry Holt, 2019. .
 William Howard Taft: The American Presidents Series: The 27th President, 1909-1913, New York: Times Books, 2018. 
 Louis D. Brandeis: American Prophet, New Haven: Yale University Press, 2016. .
 Constitution 3.0: Freedom and Technological Change, co-editor, Benjamin Wittes, Washington, D.C.: Brookings Press, 2013. .
 The Supreme Court: The Personalities and Rivalries that Defined America, New York: Times Books, 2007. .
 The Most Democratic Branch: How the Courts Serve America, New York: Oxford University Press, 2006. .
 
 The Unwanted Gaze: The Destruction of Privacy in America, New York: Random House, 2000. .

References

External links

 
 

1964 births
Living people
American legal scholars
American legal writers
Marshall Scholars
Alumni of the University of Oxford
George Washington University Law School faculty
Harvard University alumni
Yale Law School alumni
20th-century American Jews
Place of birth missing (living people)
21st-century American Jews